In mathematics, the q-expansion principle states that a modular form f has coefficients in a module M if its q-expansion at enough cusps resembles the q-expansion of a modular form g with coefficients in M. It was introduced by .

References

Modular forms